Bernard Gauthier (born 4 July 1949) is a French athlete. He competed in the men's high jump at the 1972 Summer Olympics.

References

1949 births
Living people
Athletes (track and field) at the 1972 Summer Olympics
French male high jumpers
Olympic athletes of France
Place of birth missing (living people)